公民黨 may refer to:

 Civic Party, liberal democratic political party in Hong Kong
 Civil Party (Taiwan), minor political party in the Republic of China on Taiwan